Profadol (CI-572) is an opioid analgesic which was developed in the 1960s by Parke-Davis. It acts as a mixed agonist-antagonist of the μ-opioid receptor. The analgetic potency is about the same as of pethidine (meperidine), the antagonistic effect is 1/50 of nalorphine.

Synthesis

The Knoevenagel condensation between 3'-Methoxybutyrophenone [21550-06-1] and Ethyl cyanoacetate gives (1). Conjugate addition of cyanide gives (2). Hydrolysis of both nitrile groups, saponification of the ester and decarboxylation gives the diacid, CID:164137621 (3). Imide formation occurs upon treatment with methylamine giving 3-(3-Methoxyphenyl)-1-methyl-3-propylpyrrolidine-2,5-dione, CID:163444474 (4). Reduction of the imide by lithium aluminium hydride gave [1505-32-4][29369-01-5] (5). Demethylation completed the synthesis of Profadol (6).

See also 

 Bromadol
 C-8813
 Ciramadol
 Faxeladol
 Prodilidine
 Tapentadol
 Tramadol

References 

Phenols
Pyrrolidines